General elections were held in Saint Kitts-Nevis-Anguilla on 20 September 1943. The Workers' League won all the elected seats, defeating an alliance of merchants and planters nominated by the Agricultural and Commercial Society.

Electoral system
The Legislative Council had five elected members, with each island acting as a constituency; St Kitts returned three members, whilst Anguilla and Nevis returned one each. The right to vote was restricted to those over the age of 21 who had an income of at least £30 per annum, owned property with a value of at least £100, paid at least £12 of rent per year, or had paid at least 15 shillings of direct tax in the previous year.

Results

Aftermath
Sebastian died on 25 June 1944. The subsequent by-election was won by Maurice Davis.

References

1943 elections in the Caribbean
1943
1943
1943 in Saint Kitts-Nevis-Anguilla
September 1943 events
1943 elections in the British Empire